Mikhail Valeryevich Yevstigneyev (born 25 February 1978) is a former Russian football player.

External links
 

1978 births
Living people
Russian footballers
PFC Krylia Sovetov Samara players
Russian Premier League players
Association football defenders